William John Keefe (November 17, 1873 – September 14, 1955) was a judge of the United States Customs Court.

Biography

Born on November 17, 1873, in Clinton, Iowa, Keefe received a Bachelor of Laws in 1894 from the University of Iowa College of Law. He worked in private practice in Clinton from 1895 to 1902 and again from 1910 to 1933. He served as county attorney for Clinton County, Iowa from 1902 to 1910.

Federal Judicial Service

Keefe was nominated by President Franklin D. Roosevelt on June 8, 1933, to a seat on the United States Customs Court vacated by Judge George M. Young. He was confirmed by the United States Senate on June 10, 1933, and received his commission on June 13, 1933. His service terminated on January 15, 1947, due to his retirement.

Death

Keefe died on September 14, 1955, in Bronxville, New York.

References

Sources
 

1873 births
1955 deaths
Judges of the United States Customs Court
People from Clinton, Iowa
University of Iowa College of Law alumni
United States Article I federal judges appointed by Franklin D. Roosevelt
20th-century American judges